Kretinga is a City in Klaipėda County, Lithuania. It is the capital of the Kretinga district municipality.

The population was listed as 21,421 in the 2006 census. It is the 6th largest town in the ethnographic region of Samogitia and the 17th largest town in Lithuania.

History 

Kretinga is one of the oldest known towns in Lithuania. It was first mentioned in 1253 as castle of Cretyn under the charter of Bishop Heinrich of Courland.

In 1602, Jan Karol Chodkiewicz built the first wooden church in Kretinga and established a Benedictine monastery, which became a great success. After about ten years a new brick church with an impressive organ was built. In 1610 a church school was opened.

In 1609, Jan Karol Chodkiewicz announced that he would establish a new settlement next to the old village and would grant the new borough Magdeburg rights. The new borough adopted a coat of arms depicting the Blessed Virgin Mary with the Infant Jesus in her arms. Kretinga's patron saint remains the Blessed Virgin.

In 1621, the Sapieha family gained control of the city; they changed its coat of arms to represent Saint Casimir. In 1659 and 1710 the church and monastery were destroyed by Swedish armies. The Sapieha family helped to rebuild and improve it.

In 1720, the town came under the jurisdiction of the Massalski family. Ignacy Jakub Massalski opened a university preparatory school in 1774. The town lost its municipal rights after the partitions of the Polish–Lithuanian Commonwealth.

The town prospered during the 19th century as part of the Russian Empire. In 1882 the first telephone line in Lithuania connected Kretinga with Plungė and Rietavas. In 1875, Count Tiškevičius decided to establish his family estate in Kretinga; he purchased and rebuilt an old palace. Following the fashions of the Victorian era, the family landscaped it lavishly and built a greenhouse featuring exotic flowering plants and tropical fruits. In 1890 they installed electricity in the Manor House.

During World War I, the Germans built a railway line connecting Bajorai, Kretinga, and the Latvian city of Priekule. In 1924 Kretinga regained its municipal rights. During the interwar period, the village of Kretingsodis, on the other side of the Akmena River, was incorporated into the borough. Kretinga gained greater importance after another railway line was built in 1932 that connected it to Šiauliai.

During the first Soviet occupation, under the Molotov–Ribbentrop Pact, a reign of terror resulted in local residents being arrested and, in some cases, executed without trial or deported to Siberia. A local lawyer, Vladas Petronaitis, was arrested and ultimately tortured to death by the Soviet intelligence agency.

During World War II, the Nazi occupation saw the elimination of Kretinga's Jewish population. In June 1941, German forces and Lithuanian collaborators took about 200 Jewish men and some Lithuanian communist activists to a forest outside the town and shot them in pits that some of the Jewish men had been forced to dig. Several more mass shootings including women and children took place in July at the Kretinga Jewish cemetery. As in neighbouring Palanga, local Lithuanian nationalists volunteered to assist in the killing of Jewish citizens as soon as the German army and police units had arrived.

The Soviet occupation in 1945, led to further reductions in the population as refugees fled to the west and many of those trapped were deported to Siberia.

The local economy stagnated under Soviet occupation, which forcibly collectivized the farms in the area; it became an economic backwater.

Since Lithuania's independence in 1990, the town has made a recovery; it has much to offer by way of history and art. Kretinga hosts folk music festivals, theatricals, the Kretinga Festival, celebrations on Midsummer Night's Eve (Joninės) and Mardi Gras (Užgavėnės), and a Manorial Feast. The Manor House is now a museum housing artistic and archeological collections and a restaurant in the adjacent greenhouse, called "The Winter Garden". A Cambrian geothermal reservoir underlies the area, and the Vydmantai powerplant exploiting this resource is being built nearby.

Its Kretinga Jurgis Pabrėža gymnasium was founded in 1980.

Notable people
 Simonas Daukantas (1793–1864), author of the first history of Lithuania written in Lithuanian, briefly studied in Kretinga
 Berek Joselewicz (1764–1809), Jewish-Polish merchant and a colonel of the Polish Army
 Jurgis Pabrėža, first Lithuanian botanist; died and was buried in Kretinga
 Vladas Petronaitis (1888–1941), recipient of the Lithuanian Independence Medal; he was executed during the first Soviet occupation
 Linas Pilibaitis (born 1985), Lithuanian international footballer
 Rimvydas Šilbajoris, linguist, author, and professor at Ohio State University
 Adolfas Večerskis (born 1949), actor
 Antanas Vinkus (born 1942), Lithuanian diplomat

Twin towns – sister cities

Kretinga is twinned with:

 Blankenfelde-Mahlow, Germany
 Bornholm, Denmark
 Gribskov, Denmark
 Märkisch-Oderland (district), Germany
 Osby, Sweden
 Viljandi, Estonia

References

External links

  Kretinga's official website
 Historic images of Kretinga
 The Kretinga Manor Museum
 Geothermal resources in Lithuania
 Benedictine monastery
 History of Kretinga
 Encyclopedia of Kretinga

 
Cities in Lithuania
Cities in Klaipėda County
Municipalities administrative centres of Lithuania
Telshevsky Uyezd
Holocaust locations in Lithuania